The 2010 Vo Vietnam World cup were the 3nd edition of the Vovinam VietVoDao World Cup, and were held in Hachen, North Rhine-Westphalia, Germany from 25 to 29 August 2010.

Medal summary

Medal table 

Source:

References

2010 in German sport
2010 in martial arts
Sports competitions in North Rhine-Westphalia